Ersmark may refer to:
Ersmark, Umeå, a locality in Umeå Municipality, Västerbotten County, Sweden
Ersmark, Skellefteå, a locality in Skellefteå Municipality, Västerbotten County, Sweden